Rosogolla is a 2018 Indian Bengali historical drama film directed and written by Pavel. Rosogolla marks the big screen debut of Ujaan Ganguly and Abantika Biswas. It is a fictionalized biopic of Nobin Chandra Das, a sweet maker from Kolkata, the inventor of Rosogolla.

Plot 
Rosogolla is based on the real-life story of the inventor of Bengal's own ‘Rosogolla’. The story revolves around the life and work of Nobin Chandra Das, a young man with a romantic heart and a brilliant mind. Nobin Chandra Das's father dies soon after Nobin's birth and his family faces a financial crisis. Nobin decides to become a sweet maker. With a zeal to create something fresh and unique, Nobin had set his heart on making the most delicious sweet of all time for his wife, Khirodmoni. After undergoing a lot of trials and tribulations, which even included alienating himself from his loved ones, Das finally emerged victorious and ended up creating one of the best things that could ever happen to all the Bengalis. Failure, misfortune, insult, nothing could stop Nobin. Khirodmoni Devi, his wife. She had the courage to run a business in that era. This invention makes him famous in Bengal. Based in 19th century Bengal, Rosogolla is an innocent story of love, struggle and the human aspiration to do something new.

Cast
 Ujaan Ganguly as Nobin Chandra Das
 Abantika Biswas as Khirodmoni Devi
 Kharaj Mukherjee as Mahesh
 Rajatabha Dutta as Kalidas Indra
 Bidipta Chakraborty as  Nobin Chandra's mother
 Aparajita Auddy as Zamindar ginni
 Chiranjeet Chakraborty as Braja Palowan
 Kaushik Sen as Amritalal Banik
 Anamika Saha (Guest appearance)
 Laboni Sarkar (Guest appearance)
 Pabon Kanoriya (Guest appearance)
 Asim Mukhopadhyay (Guest appearance)
 Shantilal Mukherjee as Chandu Babu/Vaikuntha Ganguly
 Subhashree Ganguly as Malkanjaan in a (Special appearance)
 Shudrujeet Dutta
 Biswajeet Sarkar
 Abhijeet Sarkar
 Rahul Ananda
 Broto Banerjee
 Projgan Ghosh
 Tamal Ray Choudhury

Soundtrack

References

External links 
 

2018 drama films
Bengali-language Indian films
2010s Bengali-language films
2018 biographical drama films
Cooking films
Cultural depictions of Indian men
Films about food and drink
Films set in Kolkata
Indian biographical drama films
Indian drama films
Indian films based on actual events
Films about chefs
Films directed by Pavel